Kavalam Sreekumar is a classical musician, Malayalam film singer and music composer from Kerala, India. His recitation of Ramayana is also famous. He has also rendered more than 60 famous Malayalam poems. He is the son of the noted Malayalam poet and dramatist Kavalam Narayana Panicker.

Biography 
Kavalam Sreekumar was born on March 3, 1959, in Alappuzha, Alappuzha district to Padmabhushan Kavalam Narayana Panicker and Shardamani. He had an elder brother named Harikrishnan, who died in 2009. He started learning classical music vocals at the age of five, and studied music under masters like Ambalappuzha Sivasankara Panicker, Thrissur Vaidyanathan, Mavelikkara Prabhakara Varma and Ambalappuzha Tulsi.

He worked for All India Radio from 1985 to 2007. While working in All India Radio, he learned classical music from the famous violinist B. Sasikumar.

Awards 

 2012 - Kerala Sangeetha Nataka Akademi Award
 1989 - Gurusashat Parabrahma - All India Radio- Annual Award for the best musical feature
 1990- Parayipetta Panthirukulam - All India Radio- Annual Award for the best musical feature
 Won first prize for consecutive 5 years in Classical Vocal in the University Youth Festival.

References

External links 

 Malayalam film songs sung by Kavalam Sreekumar (Language: English)
 Details of movie, non-movie songs sung by Kavalam Sreekumar (Language: Malayalam)

Living people
21st-century Indian male classical singers
Indian playback singers
People from Alappuzha
1959 births
20th-century Indian male classical singers
Recipients of the Kerala Sangeetha Nataka Akademi Award